Soomustüdruk is a novel by Estonian author Leida Kibuvits, first published in 1932.

Estonian novels
1932 novels